In computing, Oracle Identity Manager (OIM) enables enterprises to manage the entire user life-cycle across all enterprise resources both within and beyond a firewall. Within Oracle Identity Management it provides a mechanism for implementing the user-management aspects of a corporate policy. It can also audit users and their access privileges.

Versions 
OIM has evolved based on the needs of enterprise users. It was earlier a Thor Technologies product - after Oracle Corporation acquired Thor (2005), OIM 9i was released. OIM 9i was based on the Struts framework.

Later Oracle Corporation released OIM 11olg R1 based on Oracle Application Developmental Framework. In July 2012 Oracle released OIM 11g R2

Components 
 IT Resource Type Def: used to define the connection details of a target system.
 IT Resource: stores actual connection data. (Password is always encrypted.)
 Resource Object: the logical representation of the target system.
 Process Definition: defines the flow of actual tasks.
 Process Form: table within OIM database to hold data for a given resource object.
 Process Task: different task associated with a target system.

There are five different types of adapters used for different tasks as listed below:
 Process Task Adapter
 Pre Populate Adapter
 Task Assignment Adapter
 Rule Generator Adapter
 Entity Adapter

References 

Oracle software